Samuel Dennis (26 March 1870 – 28 January 1945) was an Australian politician. Born in Melbourne, he was educated at state schools before becoming a contractor and company director. He served on Northcote Council for 36 years before his election to the Australian House of Representatives in 1931 as the United Australia Party member for Batman. Dennis defeated Labor member Frank Brennan on a swing of over 26 percent as part of the massive UAP victory that year.  However, Batman was naturally a Labor seat, and Brennan defeated Dennis in a 1934 rematch. Dennis became a businessman after leaving politics and died in 1945.

References

United Australia Party members of the Parliament of Australia
Members of the Australian House of Representatives for Batman
Members of the Australian House of Representatives
1870 births
1945 deaths
20th-century Australian politicians